Miscellaneous Mathematical Symbols-B is a Unicode block containing miscellaneous mathematical symbols, including brackets, angles, and circle symbols.

Block

Some of these symbols are used in Z notation. Specifically 

The last two symbols are used in combinatorial game theory

History
The following Unicode-related documents record the purpose and process of defining specific characters in the Miscellaneous Mathematical Symbols-B block:

See also 
 Mathematical operators and symbols in Unicode

References

Unicode blocks